The Liberty Mutual Tower, located at 157 Berkeley Street, is a skyscraper in the Back Bay neighborhood of Boston, Massachusetts. The tower cost more than $300 million, and is built in the shape of a triangle, similar to the Flatiron Building. The building's outer appearance is traditional, but the interior is finished with modern architectural touches.

Artworks
A stainless steel abstract sculpture, entitled "Uplift" by New York artist Mia Pearlman, is located outside at street level in front of the building's triangular point, with related sculptural elements visible inside the building lobby.

References

External links
 http://www.157berkeley.com

Skyscraper office buildings in Boston
Tower